Upgrade is a 2018 cyberpunk action film written and directed by Leigh Whannell and starring Logan Marshall-Green, Betty Gabriel, and Harrison Gilbertson. The film follows a technophobe who is implanted with a chip that allows him to control his body after a mugging left him paralyzed. The film was produced by Jason Blum, under his Blumhouse Productions banner.

After premiering on 10 March 2018 at South by Southwest, the film was released on 1 June 2018 in the United States by OTL Releasing and Blumhouse Tilt, and on 14 June 2018 in Australia. The film received positive reviews from critics, who called it "one part The Six Million Dollar Man, one part Death Wish revenge fantasy", and praised the film's dark humor and action sequences.

Plot

Grey Trace, an auto mechanic, lives with his wife Asha who works for Cobolt, one of the companies contributing to human-computer augmentations. Grey asks Asha to help him return a refurbished car to his client Eron Keen, a renowned tech innovator. While visiting his home, Eron reveals his latest creation, a chip called STEM that can manage a human's motor functions.

Returning home, Grey and Asha's self-driving car malfunctions and crashes. Four men kill Asha and shoot Grey in the neck, severing his spinal cord. Grey returns home months later as a wheelchair-using quadriplegic, under the care of his mother, Pamela. Asha's death and the inability of Det. Cortez to identify their attackers causes Grey to sink into depression. After a suicide attempt, he is visited by Eron, who convinces him to accept a STEM implant.

Grey regains control of his limbs and Eron has Grey sign a non-disclosure agreement, requiring Grey to pretend to still be paralyzed. While looking through a drone video feed of his wife's murder, Grey hears STEM speak in his mind. STEM says it can help Grey get revenge and quickly identifies one of the assailants, Serk Brantner, from the video.

Grey breaks into Serk's home and finds proof Serk was "upgraded" through a secret military experiment, also connecting Serk to a local bar called the Old Bones. Serk arrives and attacks Grey, but STEM convinces Grey to temporarily give up control of his body, allowing STEM to turn Grey into a lethally efficient fighting machine, killing Serk with little effort. Cortez later sees drone footage of Grey's wheelchair approaching Serk's house, but his paralysis negates him as a suspect.

Eron has tracked STEM's movements and berates Grey for his vigilantism. Grey reveals STEM is speaking to him, which appears to surprise Eron. Eron demands that Grey stop his investigation.

Grey proceeds to the Old Bones and finds Tolan, another of the assailants. Grey allows STEM to torture Tolan to get the name of the assailants' ringleader, Fisk. Leaving the bar, Grey stumbles, and STEM informs him that Eron is attempting to shut them down remotely. STEM directs Grey to a nearby hacker, Jamie, who manages to remove STEM's input guard, then leaves just as Fisk and a companion arrives. Grey, with STEM's control restored, kills Fisk's companion.

Grey returns home only for Pamela to see him walking, forcing him to reveal STEM's existence. Cortez arrives to interrogate them after finding Grey's wheelchair suspiciously abandoned at the Old Bones. She leaves after planting a listening device on Grey's jacket. Grey wishes to give up the hunt, but STEM explains that if they do then Fisk will track them down and kill them. STEM reveals that the hack now allows it to control Grey's body even without Grey's permission. STEM uses Grey to drive to Fisk, causing an automated car to malfunction and crash into Cortez, who is tailing them. Cortez returns to Grey's home, where Pamela explains STEM.

Grey and STEM find Fisk, who reveals that Grey's wife was not the main target. Rather Fisk was hired to paralyze Grey so he could be implanted. Fisk's own upgrades outpace Grey's STEM-controlled movements. But when Grey taunts Fisk with the death of Serk, his brother, Fisk reacts emotionally allowing STEM to gain the upper hand and kill Fisk. Fisk's phone reveals messages from Eron, suggesting he'd orchestrated all the events.

Grey storms Eron's home, killing all personnel in his path, but is held at gunpoint by Cortez before he can kill Eron. Eron confesses how STEM forced him to do its bidding, having long since come to dominate all aspects of Eron's life in pursuit of its goal to become human. STEM kills Eron and attempts to kill Cortez, but Grey fights for control over his own body, managing to shoot himself.

Grey wakes up in a hospital room, not paralyzed. Asha explains he has been unconscious for two days following their crash. In reality, Grey is still in Eron's home. STEM, in full control, explains to Cortez that the psychological strain has finally broken Grey's mind; this was STEM's objective all along, as this allowed STEM to assume control over Grey's mind and body. Grey's consciousness believes the idyllic dream state it has found, while STEM kills Cortez and leaves.

Cast

Production

The film was originally titled STEM. Whannell wrote the first draft at least six years before making the film. Principal photography on the film began in March 2017 in Whannell's hometown of Melbourne. The chase scene taking place on the southern section of the Craigieburn bypass Hume Freeway (M31) goes the opposite direction to what would have been normal traffic flow to appear that it was filmed in a left hand drive country. Editing took place in Sydney.

Logan Marshall-Green based Grey's movement while under STEM's control on that of the character Zenyatta in the video game Overwatch.

Cinematographer Stefan Duscio shot the film with Arri Alexa XT and Alexa Mini cameras and Panavision C- and E-Series anamorphic lenses. The unusual camerawork during the fight scenes was achieved by attaching a phone to Marshall-Green and having the Alexa Mini track the gyroscope of the phone.

Release
After premiering on 10 March 2018 at South by Southwest and winning the Midnighters Award, the film was released on 1 June in the United States, and 14 June in Australia by Blumhouse Tilt.

Upgrade is set up for retail in 2 packages, Blu-ray with Digital HD & DVD on 28 August 2018.

Reception

Box office
In the United States, Upgrade was released on 1 June 2018, alongside Adrift and Action Point, and was projected to gross around $3 million from 1,457 theaters in its opening weekend. It ended up debuting slightly above estimates with $4.6 million and finished sixth at the box office. It was the second best opening for a BH Tilt film, after The Darkness $4.95 million in 2016. It made $2.2 million in its second weekend, finishing ninth.

Critical response
The website's critical consensus reads, "Like its augmented protagonist, Upgrades old-fashioned innards get a high-tech boost–one made even more powerful thanks to sharp humor and a solidly well-told story." On Metacritic, the film has a weighted average score of 67 out of 100, based on 33 critics, indicating "generally favorable reviews". Audiences polled by PostTrak gave the film a 78% overall positive score and a 46% "definite recommend".

In The Sunday Times (UK) Ed Potton muses, "apart from a few flimsy special effects... this is a satire that cleaves dangerously close to reality at times." Emily Yoshida, writing for New York magazine's blog Vulture, said, "A great and grimy little screw-turner of sci-fi schlock, the kind that they truly don't make anymore, the kind that would make Carpenter and Cameron proud." In a less positive review, Charles Bramesco of The Guardian said, "While Whannell wrestles with warring desires to fret over the techno oblivion we're hurtling towards or have a laugh about it, that conflict manifests in a disappointing tonal clash that robs the film of the low-rent fun it could be having."

Accolades

Television series

Leigh Whannell explained that the film was written as a standalone film without any expectations of a sequel. Based on prerelease tracking, Whannell said a sequel was unlikely.

On 16 August 2018, producer Jason Blum said he had plans for a potential sequel. In February 2020, Leigh Whannell expressed enthusiasm for making a follow-up, saying "I loved making that film, so I'd love to do it with a bit more money." Blum restated that he "would love an Upgrade sequel" and that although there were no immediate plans, it was something on both of their minds.

In May 2020, it was reported that the sequel was being reworked into a television series, with Whannell, in addition to directing the series, would co-create the series alongside Tim Walsh, who will serve as showrunner and both men will serve as executive producers. Blumhouse Television is set to produce the series alongside UCP, who have set up a writers room. The plot of the series is that it is set a few years after the events of the film, with an evolved version of STEM and new host, with the government using STEM as a way to curb criminal activity.

See also

 List of body horror media

References

External links
 
 

2018 horror films
2010s satirical films
Australian action thriller films
Australian science fiction action films
Australian science fiction thriller films
Australian satirical films
American action thriller films
American science fiction action films
American science fiction thriller films
American satirical films
Android (robot) films
Blumhouse Productions films
Drone films
American dystopian films
Films about artificial intelligence
Films about paraplegics or quadriplegics
American films about revenge
Films directed by Leigh Whannell
Films with screenplays by Leigh Whannell
Films produced by Jason Blum
Films set in the future
Films shot in Melbourne
Cyborg films
Cyberpunk films
American neo-noir films
Australian films about revenge
Techno-thriller films
2010s English-language films
2010s American films